The xenotime group is a grouping of minerals containing anhydrous phosphates and vanadates.

Xenotime group members
Members of the xenotime group include:
Phosphates:
Xenotime
Xenotime-(Y): 
Xenotime-(Yb): 
Pretulite: 
Arsenates:
Chernovite
Chernovite-(Y): 
Vanadates:
Wakefieldite
Wakefieldite-(Y): 
Wakefieldite-(La): 
Wakefieldite-(Ce): 
Wakefieldite-(Nd):

References